Francis Poulenc completed his Sonate pour violoncelle et piano (Cello Sonata), FP 143, in 1948. He first sketched it in 1940. It was dedicated to the French cellist Pierre Fournier, who had helped with the technical aspects of the cello part, as the composer was unfamiliar with the instrument. The work was published by Heugel in Paris.

Genesis 
When World War II broke out, general mobilization was decreed in France in August 1939. Poulenc was in Noizay and worked on the re-writing of his sextet and the instrumentation of the Cocardes as well as the Fiançailles pour rire. As of June 2, 1940, he was assigned to Bordeaux and noted some musical bars during a short stay in Cahors. From 18 July 1940, he was demobilized after the armistice, joined a friend in Brive-la-Gaillarde and sketched the cello sonata as well as L'Histoire de Babar, le petit éléphant and Les Animaux modèles.

It was not until the aftermath of the war that Poulenc wrote several works including a major one, the Figure humaine cantata, and completed the sonata which was finished after the Calligrammes after the homonymous work by Guillaume Apollinaire at the end of the year 1948. He resumed the draft begun in 1940 at the request of his dedicatee Pierre Fournier and returned to the writing of the sonata, but he was not inspired by writing for the cello, nor for the violin. Besides, his violin sonata was a failure and was judged by some authors weak, even mediocre. Remained in the papers of the composers for several years, the cello sonata was finally completed only in 1948. It was premiered at salle Gaveau in Paris on 18 May 1949 by Poulenc as the pianist, and Pierre Fournier, the dedicatee, as the cellist.

Reception and legacy 
Judged by some "pleasant no more", the posterity of the sonata is stronger than that of the violin sonata, notably because of its superiority. The author Renaud Machart judges the Cavatine severe but beautiful, the Finale "very successful" but deplores the lack of character of the first movement Allegro while the comments of the biographer Henri Hell are more definite and specify that "in spite of a very pretty Cavatine, it has little interest ". This appreciation is shared by  Adelaide de Place in the notice that she dedicates to the composer in the Guide de la musique chambre published by Fayard, specifying that the two works that are the violin sonata and that for cello "are not among the best pages of their author".

Style 
Some authors compare the sonata of Poulenc to the style of Vincent d'Indy or Albéric Magnard. Some of his themes recall Les Animaux modèles, a work the composer completed at the time of the sketches of this sonata.

Structure 
The sonata is in four movements:

I. Allegro – Tempo di Marcia
II. Cavatine
III. Ballabile
IV. Finale

Each movement is in ternary form, having a contrasting middle section. The piece makes much use of Neo-Baroque and Neo-Classical styles.

Selected discography 
 Pierre Fournier (cello), Jacques Février (piano): Francis Poulenc – Musique de chambre Vol. 1 – EMI
 François Salque (cello), Éric Le Sage (piano) : Francis Poulenc – Intégrale Musique de chambre – RCA Red Seal
Daniel Müller-Schott (cello), Robert Kulek (piano): Debussy - Poulenc - Franck - Ravel

References

Bibliography

External links 

Compositions by Francis Poulenc
Poulenc
1948 compositions